The Paulista Football Championship of 2020 will be the 28th edition of this championship women's football organized by the Paulista Football Federation (FPF). Played between October and December, the competition will have twelve participants.

Format
The 2020 Campeonato Paulista de Futebol Feminino will be held in four stages:

In the first, the twelve are divided into 2 groups of 6 teams, facing each other home and away, with the four best in each group qualifying to the next round. From then on, the competition will be played as single eliminatory games, with the winners advancing to the semifinals and then to the final

Tiebreaker criteria
In the case of tie between two and more teams the following criteria will be used:

Number of wins
Goal difference
Goals Scored
Fewer red cards received
Fewer yellow cards received
Drawing of lots

Teams

Standings

Group A

Group B

Knock-out stage

Bracket

Quarter-finals

|}

RB Bragantino won 2-1 on aggregate and advanced to the semi-finals.

Palmeiras won 3-0 on aggregate and advanced to the semi-finals.

Corinthians won 5-4 on aggregate and advanced to the semi-finals.

Ferroviaria won 5-1 on aggregate and advanced to the semi-finals.

Semi-finals

|} 

Ferroviaria won 4-0 on aggregate and advanced to the final.

Corinthians won 3-2 on aggregate and advanced to the final.

Final

|}

References

Women's football competitions in Brazil
Campeonato Paulista seasons